Gary Fettis (born 1950) is an American set decorator. He has been nominated for three Academy Awards in the category Best Art Direction.

Selected filmography
 The Godfather Part III (1990)
 Changeling (2008)
 Interstellar (2014)
 Dunkirk (2017)

References

External links

1950 births
Living people
American set decorators